Li Yanrong is a Chinese chemist and materials scientist who is currently the President of Sichuan University. Previously, he was President of University of Electronic Science and Technology of China (UESTC). He is a chemical and materials engineer.

Early life
Li was born in Shehong, Suining, Sichuan province in 1961. He graduated with a PhD degree from Changchun Institute of Applied Chemistry, Chinese Academy of Sciences, China in 1992. From 1978 - 1983, he studied his undergraduate degree at Sichuan Normal University, China in chemistry.

Career
In 1993, he joined UESTC as a faculty member. From 1998 - 2001, he became Dean of the School of Material Engineering.
Thereafter, he became Dean of the School of Microelectronics and Solid State Electronics. From 2013 - 2017, he became
President of UESTC. Since December 2017, he has been the President of Sichuan University, China. In 2019, he was appointed the 
President of Sichuan Association of Science and Technology.

Awards
Li was elected to the Chinese Academy of Engineering in 2011.

References 

1961 births
Living people
Chinese chemists
Academic staff of the University of Electronic Science and Technology of China
Members of the Chinese Academy of Engineering